Jungang Station is a railway station on the Ansan Line in Ansan, South Korea. Its substation name is Seoul Institute of the Arts. It is a busy station located close to the Ansan Express Bus Terminal.

The Sinansan Line will connect Jungang Station to Yeouido Station in 2023.

Station layout

Station information 
Nearby universities include Seoul National University of Arts (substation name), and Korea Hotel Tourism College, a vocational school, is a two-minute walk away.

It is near this station where Ansan citizens gather when they want to drink and play in downtown Ansan. In addition, Ansan Bus Terminal is about a 10-minute walk from this station.

If you go out of the exit of Jungang Station, there is an underground road crossing Jungang-daero, and if you cross the underground road and go to the stairs on the right, you will find Burger King.

References

Metro stations in Ansan
Seoul Metropolitan Subway stations
Railway stations opened in 1988